The 2015–16 Los Angeles Lakers season was the franchise's 68th season, its 67th season in the National Basketball Association (NBA), and its 56th in Los Angeles. The Lakers looked to rebound following its worst season in franchise history in 2014–15, but would finish with a new franchise-worst 17–65 record, which included a season-high and a record–tying, 10–game losing streak in January.  Jordan Hill, Jeremy Lin, Wesley Johnson, Wayne Ellington, Carlos Boozer, Ronnie Price, and Ed Davis all departed respectively. The Lakers drafted D'Angelo Russell, Larry Nance Jr., and Anthony Brown in the 2015 NBA draft. Afterwards, the Lakers traded for former Pacers' center Roy Hibbert and signed for the reigning Sixth Man of the Year, Lou Williams, and forward Brandon Bass. Former Lakers forward, Metta World Peace, was brought back to the team as well after the Lakers amnestied him in 2013.

This was Kobe Bryant's final season with the team and in the NBA after he announced his retirement. Playing 20 years in the league, Bryant won five championships, two Finals MVPs, and an MVP with the Lakers and is widely regarded as one of the greatest basketball players of all time. Bryant was one of the two last remaining active players from the 1996 NBA Draft, along with Ray Allen, who at the time was a free agent after not playing a game since the end of the 2013–14 season. Allen officially announced his retirement in November 2016. After Allen and Bryant's retirements, there would remain only three active players from the 1990s; Dirk Nowitzki of the Dallas Mavericks, Vince Carter of the Memphis Grizzlies, and Jason Terry of the Houston Rockets.

Following the season, Byron Scott was fired as head coach after two seasons with the team and replaced by Golden State Warriors assistant and former Lakers player Luke Walton, who played for the Lakers from 2003–2012.

Draft

Roster

Standings

Division

Conference

Preseason

|- style="background:#fbb;"
| 1
| October 4
| Utah
| 71–90
| Lou Williams (14)
| Roy Hibbert (10)
| Lou Williams (4)
| Stan Sheriff Center10,300
| 0–1
|- style="background:#fbb;"
| 2
| October 7
| Utah
| 114–117 (OT)
| Lou Williams (20)
| Roy Hibbert (11)
| Julius Randle (4)
| Stan Sheriff Center10,300
| 0–2
|- style="background:#fbb;"
| 3
| October 8
| Toronto
| 97–105
| Lou Williams (19)
| Jonathan Holmes (6)
| Jordan Clarkson (6)
| Citizens Business Bank Arena8,123
| 0–3
|- style="background:#bfb;"
| 4
| October 11
| Maccabi Haifa
| 126–83
| Kobe Bryant (21)
| Roy Hibbert (16)
| D'Angelo Russell (11)
| Staples Center14,810
| 1–3
|- style= "background:#fbb;"
| 5
| October 13
| Sacramento
| 100–107
| Jordan Clarkson (17)
| Roy Hibbert (10)
| Julius Randle (6)
| MGM Grand Garden Arena11,618
| 1–4
|- style="background:#bfb;"
| 6
| October 17
| Golden State
| 85–70
| Jordan Clarkson (17)
| Roy Hibbert (6)
| Marcelo Huertas (6)
| Valley View Casino Center14,100
| 2–4
|- style="background:#bfb;"
| 7
| October 19
| Portland
| 104–102
| Jordan Clarkson (17)
| Black, Randle, Upshaw (6)
| Marcelo Huertas (8)
| Staples Center15,123
| 3–4
|- style="background:#fcc;"
| 8
| October 22
| Golden State
| 97–136
| Lou Williams (19)
| Roy Hibbert (10)
| D'Angelo Russell (4)
| Honda Center16,222
| 3–5

Regular season game log

|- style="background:#fbb;"
| 1
| October 28
| Minnesota
| 
| Kobe Bryant (24)
| Julius Randle (11)
| Roy Hibbert (4)
| Staples Center18,997
| 0–1
|- style="background:#fbb;"
| 2
| October 30
| @ Sacramento
| 
| Jordan Clarkson (22)
| Ryan Kelly (6)
| Lou Williams (5)
| Sleep Train Arena17,391
| 0–2

|- style="background:#fbb;"
| 3
| November 1
| Dallas
| 
| Julius Randle (22)
| Julius Randle (15)
| Julius Randle (4)
| Staples Center18,997
| 0–3
|- style="background:#fbb;"
| 4
| November 3
| Denver
| 
| Jordan Clarkson (30)
| Tarik Black (8)
| D'Angelo Russell (6)
| Staples Center18,997
| 0–4
|- style="background:#bfb;"
| 5
| November 6
| @ Brooklyn
| 
| Kobe Bryant (18)
| Hibbert, Randle (7)
| Bryant, Clarkson, Randle, Williams (3)
| Barclays Center17,732
| 1–4
|- style="background:#fbb;"
| 6
| November 8
| @ New York
| 
| Bryant, Hibbert (18)
| Julius Randle (11)
| Lou Williams (5)
| Madison Square Garden19,812
| 1–5
|- style="background:#fbb;"
| 7
| November 10
| @ Miami
| 
| Nick Young (17)
| Black, Randle (7)
| Huertas, Randle, Russell (4)
| American Airlines Arena19,825
| 1–6
|- style="background:#fbb;"
| 8
| November 11
| @ Orlando
| 
| Roy Hibbert (15)
| Julius Randle (8)
| Clarkson, Huertas (5)
| Amway Center18,846
| 1–7
|- style="background:#fbb;"
| 9
| November 13
| @ Dallas
| 
| Jordan Clarkson (21)
| Bass, Randle (10)
| D'Angelo Russell (5)
| American Airlines Center20,260
| 1–8
|- style="background:#bfb;"
| 10
| November 15
| Detroit
| 
| Bryant, Clarkson (17)
| Bryant, Randle (8)
| Kobe Bryant (9)
| Staples Center18,997
| 2–8
|- style="background:#fbb;"
| 11
| November 16
| @ Phoenix
| 
| Jordan Clarkson (20)
| Roy Hibbert (6)
| Roy Hibbert (3)
| Talking Stick Resort Arena18,055
| 2–9
|- style="background:#fbb;"
| 12
| November 20
| Toronto
| 
| Julius Randle (18)
| Julius Randle (12)
| Kobe Bryant (5)
| Staples Center18,997
| 2–10
|- style="background:#fbb;"
| 13
| November 22
| Portland
| 
| Jordan Clarkson (19)
| Julius Randle (13)
| D'Angelo Russell (6)
| Staples Center18,997
| 2–11
|- style="background:#fbb;"
| 14
| November 24
| @ Golden State
| 
| Nance, Randle, Williams (10)
| Black, Bryant, Hibbert, Randle (6)
| Metta World Peace (3)
| Oracle Arena19,596
| 2–12
|- style="background:#fbb;"
| 15
| November 28
| @ Portland
| 
| Kobe Bryant (21)
| Hibbert, Randle (6)
| D'Angelo Russell (5)
| Moda Center20,019
| 2–13
|- style="background:#fbb;"
| 16
| November 29
| Indiana
| 
| Jordan Clarkson, Young (22)
| Julius Randle (11)
| Jordan Clarkson (6)
| Staples Center18,997
| 2–14

|- style="background:#fbb;"
| 17
| December 1
| @ Philadelphia
| 
| Kobe Bryant (20)
| Julius Randle (11)
| D'Angelo Russell (4)
| Wells Fargo Center20,510
| 2–15
|- style="background:#bfb;"
| 18
| December 2
| @ Washington
| 
| Kobe Bryant (31)
| Julius Randle (19)
| Lou Williams (4)
| Verizon Center20,356
| 3–15
|- style="background:#fbb;"
| 19
| December 4
| @ Atlanta
| 
| Lou Williams (18)
| D'Angelo Russell (10)
| Kobe Bryant (5)
| Philips Arena19,051
| 3–16
|- style="background:#fbb;"
| 20
| December 6
| @ Detroit
| 
| Lou Williams (21)
| Julius Randle (11)
| Marcelo Huertas (4)
| The Palace of Auburn Hills16,394
| 3–17
|- style="background:#fbb;"
| 21
| December 7
| @ Toronto
| 
| Kobe Bryant (21)
| Julius Randle (11)
| Bryant, Hibbert (4)
| Air Canada Centre20,163
| 3–18
|- style="background:#fbb;"
| 22
| December 9
| @ Minnesota
| 
| D'Angelo Russell (23)
| Julius Randle (12)
| Lou Williams (5)
| Target Center18,076
| 3–19
|- style="background:#fbb;"
| 23
| December 11
| @ San Antonio
| 
| D'Angelo Russell (24)
| Julius Randle (7)
| D'Angelo Russell (6)
| AT&T Center18,418
| 3–20
|- style="background:#fbb;"
| 24
| December 12
| @ Houston
| 
| Kobe Bryant (25)
| Julius Randle (10)
| Kobe Bryant (6)
| Toyota Center18,456
| 3–21
|- style="background:#bfb;"
| 25
| December 15
| Milwaukee
| 
| Kobe Bryant (22)
| Roy Hibbert (11)
| D'Angelo Russell (7)
| Staples Center18,997
| 4–21
|- style="background:#fbb;"
| 26
| December 17
| Houston
| 
| Kobe Bryant (22)
| Julius Randle (10)
| D'Angelo Russell (7)
| Staples Center18,997
| 4–22
|- style="background:#fbb;"
| 27
| December 19
| @ Oklahoma City
| 
| Lou Williams (20)
| Randle, Russell (7)
| D'Angelo Russell (5)
| Chesapeake Energy Arena18,203
| 4–23
|- style="background:#bfb;"
| 28
| December 22
| @ Denver
| 
| Kobe Bryant (31)
| Julius Randle (10)
| Bryant, Williams (5)
| Pepsi Center19,124
| 5–23
|- style="background:#fbb;"
| 29
| December 23
| Oklahoma City
| 
| Kobe Bryant (19)
| Bass, Clarkson, Sacre (6)
| Marcelo Huertas (4)
| Staples Center18,997
| 5–24
|- style="background:#fbb;"
| 30
| December 25
| LA Clippers
| 
| D'Angelo Russell (16)
| Julius Randle (8)
| Bryant, Clarkson (4)
| Staples Center18,997
| 5–25
|- style="background:#fbb;"
| 31
| December 27
| @ Memphis
| 
| Kobe Bryant (19)
| Larry Nance Jr. (11)
| Clarkson, Russell (3)
| FedEx Forum18,119
| 5–26
|- style="background:#fbb;"
| 32
| December 28
| @ Charlotte
| 
| Kobe Bryant (20)
| Roy Hibbert (8)
| Lou Williams (7)
| Time Warner Cable Arena19,632
| 5–27
|- style="background:#bfb;"
| 33
| December 30
| @ Boston
| 
| Jordan Clarkson (24)
| Julius Randle (12)
| Julius Randle (4)
| TD Garden18,624
| 6–27

|- style="background:#bfb;"
| 34
| January 1
| Philadelphia
| 
| Lou Williams (24)
| Larry Nance Jr. (14)
| Russell, Williams (5)
| Staples Center18,997
| 7–27
|- style="background:#bfb;"
| 35
| January 3
| Phoenix
| 
| Lou Williams (30)
| Larry Nance Jr. (14)
| Jordan Clarkson (7)
| Staples Center18,997
| 8–27
|- style="background:#fbb;"
| 36
| January 5
| Golden State
| 
| Jordan Clarkson (23)
| Julius Randle (9)
| Marcelo Huertas (5)
| Staples Center18,997
| 8–28
|- style="background:#fbb;"
| 37
| January 7
| @ Sacramento
| 
| Kobe Bryant (28)
| Julius Randle (10)
| Bass, Clarkson, Russell (4)
| Sleep Train Arena17,386
| 8–29
|- style="background:#fbb;"
| 38
| January 8
| Oklahoma City
| 
| Lou Williams (44)
| Julius Randle (8)
| Kobe Bryant (6)
| Staples Center18,997
| 8–30
|- style="background:#fbb;"
| 39
| January 10
| Utah
| 
| Lou Williams (18)
| Larry Nance Jr. (11)
| Lou Williams (6)
| Staples Center18,997
| 8–31
|- style="background:#bfb;"
| 40
| January 12
| New Orleans
| 
| Lou Williams (19)
| Julius Randle (11)
| Lou Williams (8)
| Staples Center18,997
| 9–31
|- style="background:#fbb;"
| 41
| January 14
| @ Golden State
| 
| Jordan Clarkson (22)
| Julius Randle (9)
| Bryant, Randle, Russell, Williams (3)
| Oracle Arena19,596
| 9–32
|- style="background:#fbb;"
| 42
| January 16
| @ Utah
| 
| Lou Williams (20)
| Anthony Brown (7)
| D'Angelo Russell (4)
| Vivint Smart Home Arena19,911
| 9–33
|- style="background:#fbb;"
| 43
| January 17
| Houston
| 
| Lou Williams (20)
| Julius Randle (11)
| Kobe Bryant (9)
| Staples Center18,997
| 9–34
|- style="background:#fbb;"
| 44
| January 20
| Sacramento
| 
| Brandon Bass (18)
| Julius Randle (12)
| D'Angelo Russell (5)
| Staples Center18,997
| 9–35
|- style="background:#fbb;"
| 45
| January 22
| San Antonio
| 
| D'Angelo Russell (18)
| Julius Randle (14)
| Kobe Bryant (6)
| Staples Center18,997
| 9–36
|- style="background:#fbb;"
| 46
| January 23
| @ Portland
| 
| D'Angelo Russell (21)
| Julius Randle (9)
| Clarkson, Williams (3)
| Moda Center19,728
| 9–37
|- style="background:#fbb;"
| 47
| January 26
| Dallas
| 
| Jordan Clarkson (18)
| Julius Randle (11)
| Jordan Clarkson (7)
| Staples Center18,997
| 9–38
|- style="background:#fbb;"
| 48
| January 28
| Chicago
| 
| Jordan Clarkson (16)
| Julius Randle (8)
| Clarkson, Russell (4)
| Staples Center18,997
| 9–39
|- style="background:#fbb;"
| 49
| January 29
| @ LA Clippers
| 
| Julius Randle (20)
| Julius Randle (14)
| D'Angelo Russell (5)
| Staples Center19,495
| 9–40
|- style="background:#fbb;"
| 50
| January 31
| Charlotte
| 
| Kobe Bryant (23)
| Julius Randle (11)
| Kobe Bryant (3)
| Staples Center18,997
| 9–41

|- style="background:#bfb;"
| 51
| February 2
| Minnesota
| 
| Kobe Bryant (38)
| Julius Randle (12)
| Kobe Bryant (5)
| Staples Center18,997
| 10–41
|- style="background:#bfb;"
| 52
| February 4
| @ New Orleans
| 
| Kobe Bryant (27)
| Kobe Bryant (12)
| Randle, Russell (3)
| Smoothie King Center18,420
| 11–41
|- style="background:#fbb;"
| 53
| February 6
| @ San Antonio
| 
| Kobe Bryant (25)
| Julius Randle (17)
| Bryant, Clarkson, Randle, Williams (4)
| AT&T Center18,418
| 11–42
|- style="background:#fbb;"
| 54
| February 8
| @ Indiana
| 
| Kobe Bryant (19)
| Julius Randle (19)
| D'Angelo Russell (6)
| Bankers Life Fieldhouse18,165
| 11–43
|- style="background:#fbb;"
| 55
| February 10
| @ Cleveland
| 
| Lou Williams (28)
| Julius Randle (8)
| Jordan Clarkson (7)
| Quicken Loans Arena20,562
| 11–44
|- align="center"
|colspan="9" bgcolor="#bbcaff"|All-Star Break
|- style="background:#fbb;"
| 56
| February 19
| San Antonio
| 
| Kobe Bryant (25)
| Julius Randle (15)
| Jordan Clarkson (6)
| Staples Center18,997
| 11–45
|- style="background:#fbb;"
| 57
| February 21
| @ Chicago
| 
| Bryant, Randle (22)
| Julius Randle (12)
| D'Angelo Russell (6)
| United Center23,143
| 11–46
|- style="background:#fbb;"
| 58
| February 22
| @ Milwaukee
| 
| Nick Young (19)
| Julius Randle (7)
| Russell, Williams (4)
| BMO Harris Bradley Center11,639
| 11–47
|- style="background:#fbb;"
| 59
| February 24
| @ Memphis
| 
| Jordan Clarkson (28)
| Julius Randle (14)
| D'Angelo Russell (8)
| FedExForum18,119
| 11–48
|- style="background:#fbb;"
| 60
| February 26
| Memphis
| 
| D'Angelo Russell (22)
| Julius Randle (7)
| Russell, Williams (3)
| Staples Center18,997
| 11–49

|- style="background:#bfb;"
| 61
| March 1
| Brooklyn
| 
| D'Angelo Russell (39)
| Julius Randle (13)
| Jordan Clarkson (7)
| Staples Center18,997
| 12–49
|- style="background:#fbb;"
| 62
| March 2
| @ Denver
| 
| D'Angelo Russell (24)
| Black, Randle (7)
| Marcelo Huertas (8)
| Pepsi Center20,096
| 12–50
|- style="background:#fbb;"
| 63
| March 4
| Atlanta
| 
| Julius Randle (16)
| Julius Randle (10)
| D'Angelo Russell (5)
| Staples Center18,997
| 12–51
|- style="background:#bfb;"
| 64
| March 6
| Golden State
| 
| Jordan Clarkson (25)
| Julius Randle (14)
| Marcelo Huertas (9)
| Staples Center18,997
| 13–51
|- style="background:#bfb;"
| 65
| March 8
| Orlando
| 
| D'Angelo Russell (27)
| Julius Randle (11)
| Marcelo Huertas (5)
| Staples Center18,997
| 14–51
|- style="background:#fbb;"
| 66
| March 10
| Cleveland
| 
| Kobe Bryant (26)
| Julius Randle (9)
| Huertas, Russell (5)
| Staples Center18,997
| 14–52
|- style="background:#fbb;"
| 67
| March 13
| New York
| 
| Lou Williams (15)
| Julius Randle (8)
| Lou Williams (5)
| Staples Center18,997
| 14–53
|- style="background:#fbb;"
| 68
| March 15
| Sacramento
| 
| Lou Williams (17)
| Julius Randle (11)
| Marcelo Huertas (6)
| Staples Center18,997
| 14–54
|- style="background:#fbb;"
| 69
| March 18
| Phoenix
| 
| Lou Williams (30)
| Julius Randle (9)
| Marcelo Huertas (10)
| Staples Center18,997
| 14–55
|- style="background:#bfb;"
| 70
| March 22
| Memphis
| 
| Jordan Clarkson (22)
| Julius Randle (14)
| Marcelo Huertas (7)
| Staples Center18,997
| 15–55
|- style="background:#fbb;"
| 71
| March 23
| @ Phoenix
| 
| Julius Randle (19)
| Julius Randle (15)
| Lou Williams (5)
| Talking Stick Resort Arena18,191
| 15–56
|- style="background:#fbb;"
| 72
| March 25
| Denver
| 
| Kobe Bryant (28)
| Julius Randle (18)
| Julius Randle (10)
| Staples Center18,997
| 15–57
|- style="background:#fbb;"
| 73
| March 27
| Washington
| 
| D'Angelo Russell (22)
| Bass, Nance, Randle (7)
| Bass, Clarkson, Huertas (3)
| Staples Center18,997
| 15–58
|- style="background:#fbb;"
| 74
| March 28
| @ Utah
| 
| Lou Williams (16)
| Jordan Clarkson (8)
| Bryant, Clarkson, Huertas (2)
| Vivint Smart Home Arena19,911
| 15–59
|- style="background:#bfb;"
| 75
| March 30
| Miami
| 
| Jordan Clarkson (26)
| Julius Randle (14)
| Marcelo Huertas (4)
| Staples Center18,997
| 16–59

|- style="background:#fbb;"
| 76
| April 3
| Boston
| 
| Kobe Bryant (34)
| Julius Randle (10)
| D'Angelo Russell (6)
| Staples Center18,997
| 16–60
|- style="background:#fbb;"
| 77
| April 5
| @ LA Clippers
| 
| Metta World Peace (17)
| Julius Randle (12)
| Julius Randle (4)
| Staples Center19,537
| 16–61
|- style="background:#fbb;"
| 78
| April 6
| LA Clippers
| 
| Kobe Bryant (17)
| Julius Randle (20)
| Marcelo Huertas (5)
| Staples Center18,997
| 16–62
|- style="background:#fbb;"
| 79
| April 8
| @ New Orleans
| 
| D'Angelo Russell (32)
| Roy Hibbert (6)
| Julius Randle (6)
| Smoothie King Center18,607
| 16–63
|- style="background:#fbb;"
| 80
| April 10
| @ Houston
| 
| Kobe Bryant (35)
| Jordan Clarkson (8)
| Marcelo Huertas (7)
| Toyota Center18,442
| 16–64
|- style="background:#fbb;"
| 81
| April 11
| @ Oklahoma City
| 
| Kobe Bryant (13)
| Julius Randle (13)
| Marcelo Huertas (5)
| Chesapeake Energy Arena18,203
| 16–65
|- style="background:#bfb;"
| 82
| April 13
| Utah
| 
| Kobe Bryant (60)
| Julius Randle (9)
| Marcelo Huertas (6)
| Staples Center18,997
| 17–65

Player statistics

Regular season
Bold – Leaders (Qualified)
* – Recorded statistics when playing for Los Angeles

|
| 66 || 0 || 20.3 || style="background:#FDB927;color:#552583;" |.549|| .000 || .845 || 4.3 || 1.1 || .5 || .8 || 7.2
|-
|
| 39 || 0 || 12.7 || .548|| .000 || .422 || 4.0 || .4 || .4 || .5 || 3.4
|-
|
| 29 || 11 || 20.7 || .310 || .286 || .850 || 2.4 || .7 || .5 || .2 || 4.0
|-
|
| 66 || 66 || 28.2 || .358 || .285 || .826 || 3.7 || 2.8 || .9 || .2 || style="background:#FDB927;color:#552583;" |17.6
|-
|
| 79 || 79 || style="background:#FDB927;color:#552583;" |32.3 || .433 || .347 || .804 || 4.0 || 2.4 || 1.1 || .1 || 15.5
|-
|
| style="background:#FDB927;color:#552583;" |81 || style="background:#FDB927;color:#552583;" |81 || 23.2 || .443 || .000 || .807 || 4.9 || 1.2 || .4 || style="background:#FDB927;color:#552583;" |1.4 || 5.9
|-
|
| 53 || 0 || 16.4 || .422 || .262 || style="background:#FDB927;color:#552583;" |.931 || 1.7 || style="background:#FDB927;color:#552583;" |3.4 || .5 || .1 || 4.5
|-
|
| 36 || 0 || 13.1 || .369 || .135 || .685 || 3.4 || .6 || .4 || .3 || 4.2
|-
|
| 63 || 22 || 20.1 || .527 || .100 || .681 || 5.0 || .7 || .9 || .4 || 5.5
|-
|
| style="background:#FDB927;color:#552583;" |81 || 60 || 28.2 || .429 || .278 || .715 || style="background:#FDB927;color:#552583;" |10.2 || 1.8 || .7 || .4 || 11.3
|-
|
| 80 || 48 || 28.2 || .410 || style="background:#FDB927;color:#552583;" |.351 || .737 || 3.4 || 3.3 || style="background:#FDB927;color:#552583;" |1.2 || .2 || 13.2
|-
|
| 25 || 1 || 12.8 || .413 || .000 || .658 || 2.9 || .6 || .2 || .4 || 3.5
|-
|
| 67 || 35 || 28.5 || .408|| .344 || .830 || 2.5 || 2.5 || .9 || .3 || 15.3
|-
|
| 35 || 5 || 16.9 || .311 || .310 || .702 || 2.5 || .8 || .6 || .3 || 5.0
|-
|
| 54 || 2 || 19.1 || .339 || .325 || .829 || 1.8 || .6 || .4 || .1 || 7.3
|}

Transactions

Trades

Free agents

Additions

Subtractions

References

External links
 
 

Los Angeles Lakers seasons
Los Angeles Lakers
Los Angeles Lakers
Los Angeles Lakers